Stacia L. Haynie (born April 6, 1959) is an American political scientist. In 2018, Haynie was appointed Louisiana State University's executive vice president and provost.

Early life and education
Haynie was born on April 6, 1959 and grew up on her grandfather’s Texas cotton farm. She received a bachelor’s degree in theater in 1981 and a Master’s degree in political science in 1986 from Midwestern State University. In 1990, she received her Ph.D. in political science from the University of North Texas. Due to her parents financial situation, she was only able to enroll in post-secondary education due academic and private donar scholarships.

Career
Upon completing her formal education, Haynie accepted a political science faculty position at Louisiana State University (LSU) in 1990. She was appointed to the interim dean of the Graduate School but assumed the position as vice provost of the Office of Academic Affairs in February 2008. Haynie returned to teaching in January 2011 to teach introduction to American government and judicial process courses. She returned to an administrator role in 2014 after she was selected to replace Gaines Foster as dean of LSU's College of Humanities and Social Sciences. In 2018, Haynie was appointed LSU's executive vice president and provost.

During the COVID-19 pandemic, Haynie was ranked by the Business Report as an Influential Women in Business.

Personal life
Haynie is married.

Selected publications
Judging in Black and White: Decision Making in the South African Appellate Division, 1950-1990. (2003)

References

Living people
1959 births
Academics from Texas
American political scientists
American women political scientists
Midwestern State University alumni
University of North Texas alumni
Louisiana State University faculty
21st-century American women